Ichneutica hartii is a moth of the family Noctuidae. This species is endemic to New Zealand and can be found only in the North Island. I. hartii is similar in appearance to Ichneutica agrorastis but can be distinguished as it tends to be smaller in size and have a more purplish shade to its fore wings. I. hartii tends to be found inhabiting lowland native forest or forests found in the hilly ranges of the North Island. It is attracted to light and the adults of this moth are on the wing between January and March. Much of its life history is currently unknown as are the larvae host species.

Taxonomy

This species was first described by W. G. Howes in 1914 from a single male specimen obtained by Mr S. Hart near Cape Egmont Lighthouse. This holotype species is held at the Auckland War Memorial Museum. In 1988 J. S. Dugdale placed this species within the Tmetolophota genus. In 2019 Robert Hoare undertook a major review of New Zealand Noctuidae species. During this review the genus Ichneutica was greatly expanded and the genus Tmetolophota was subsumed into that genus as a synonym. As a result of this review, this species is now known as Ichneutica hartii.

Description 

Howes described this species as follows
I. hartii is closely related to I. agorastis and as such is very similar in appearance. I.hartii can be distinguished from I. agorastis as the former has a smaller wingspan with an apporximate size of 33 mm. However in the central North Island some specimens are of a larger size than this norm. I. hartii also has a more purplish shade to its forewings in comparison to the reddish shade of I. agorastis.

Distribution
It is endemic to New Zealand and is widespread in the North Island.

Habitat 
This species can be found in lowland native forest as well as in hill ranges up to approximately 800m in altitude.

Behaviour 
Adults of this species are on the wing from January to March. This species is attracted to light.

Life history and host species 
The life history of this species is unknown as are the host species of its larvae.

References

Moths described in 1914
Moths of New Zealand
Hadeninae
Endemic fauna of New Zealand
Taxa named by George Howes (entomologist)
Endemic moths of New Zealand